The Tohono Oʼodham Indian Reservation, is an Indian reservation of the Tohono Oʼodham Nation located in Arizona, United States. The reservation had a total 2000 census population of 10,787. The reservation encompasses portions of central Pima, southwestern Pinal, and southeastern Maricopa Counties.

The land is also site of the Quinlan and Baboquivari Mountains, which include Kitt Peak, and the Kitt Peak National Observatory and telescopes, as well as Baboquivari Peak. These astronomical sites are under lease from the Tohono Oʼodham Nation. The lease was approved by the council in the 1950s, for a one-time payment of US$25,000 plus $10 per acre per year.

When the Spaniards first encountered the tribe in 1694, they made note of one of the tribe's inhabited villages called Batki, a site that was later abandoned in about 1850. The village of Batki was located in what is now the Sells District of the Tohono O'odham Nation, in the upper Northwest corner of the reservation.

Tohono Oʼodham Nation communities

Ak Chin
Buenos Aires
Chuichu
Pisinemo
Santa Rosa (Kaij Mek)
Sells
Sweetwater,  
Topawa
Kaka
Kohatk
Tat Momoli
Gu Vo
Hickiwan
Why (portion)

Communications
The telephone area code for the Tohono Oʼodham Reservation is 520.

References

Geography of Maricopa County, Arizona
Geography of Pima County, Arizona
Geography of Pinal County, Arizona
Tohono O'odham Nation reservations